The 2010 Greek Ice Hockey Championship season was the ninth season of the Greek Ice Hockey Championship. Nine teams participated in the league, and Iptamenoi Pagodromoi Athinai won their sixth league title.

Regular season

External links
Season on icehockey.gr

Greek Ice Hockey Championship seasons
Greek
Ice Hockey Championship season